The Quincy Conserve (commonly known as Quincy Conserve) was a New Zealand group that were active from 1967 to 1975. Originating from Wellington, they were one of the biggest bands in the lower North Island.

Background
Among the various lineups, the membership has included Bruno Lawrence. For a while trombonist Rodger Fox was a member. For a period of time they were the house band for Wellington’s HMV Studios.

1960s
The group started out in late 1967, and was formed by Malcolm Hayman. In 1968, they were backing Allison Durbin on some of her recordings.

1970s
In 1970, Kevin Furey who had previously been with the group Top shelf joined the group. At a point in time that year, the lineup consisted of Furey, Malcolm Hayman, Bruno Lawrence, Johnny McCormick, Dennis Mason, Dave Orams and Rufus Rehu. Also in 1970, the Bruno Lawrence composition "Ride the Rain" came in the finals at that year's Loxene Golden Disc Awards.

In 1971, the group briefly reunited with Allison Durbin to play at the Downtown Club in Wellington. In 1973, they backed The Brothers Johnson at the Downtown Club.

In 1974. They released the single, "Song For The Man", composed by Paul Clayton, backed with "Epistolary", composed by Anderson and Wise. It was released on the Ode label. The following year it was released in Australia on Warner Brothers. Tony Kaye produced both sides of the release. It was also an APRA Silver Scroll nominated song for 1975.

They disbanded in 1975.

Later years
In 1980, guitarist Kevin Furey, who was married to the cousin of Deane Waretini's Manager George Tait, played the trumpet on Waretini's hit "The Bridge". Furey later played for several years with the Royal  New Zealand Navy band. In 2013, Furey teamed up with Larry Morris to play in his band Larry Morris & Rebellion.

In later years Malcolm Hayman was in a band called Captain Custard which featured Murray Loveridge, Dave Alexander and Don Burke. A later line up of Captain Custard included Peter Whyte, Stu Petrie and Jimmy Dwan.

Line-up
 Malcolm Hayman: lead guitar, vocals, arrangements
 Kevin Furey: guitar, trumpet, vocals
 Ria Kerekere: vocals
 Dave Orams: bass guitar, vocals
 Graeme Thompson: bass guitar, vocals
 Frits Stigter: bass guitar
 Rufus Rehu:  keyboards
 Johnny McCormick: saxophone, flute
 Dennis Mason: saxophone, vocals
 Barry Brown-Sharpe: trumpet, tenor horn
 Raice McLeod: drums
 Earl Anderson: drums
 Brian Beauchamp: drums
 Bruno Lawrence: drums
 Richard Burgess: drums
 Tom Swainson: drums
 Mike Conway: drums
 Billy Brown: drums
 Paul Clayton: guitar, vocals
 Harry Leki: guitar
 Murray Loveridge: bass guitar
 Peter Blake: keyboards
 Rodger Fox: trombone
 Geoff Culverwell: trumpet
 Peter Cross: trumpet

Discography

Singles

Studio albums
Listen To The Band (1970 - Regal)
Epitaph (Quincy Conserve 1967-71) (1972 - Regal)
Tasteful (1973 - EMI)
The Quincy Conserve (1975 - Õde Records)

Live albums
Live with Lutha, Blerta and Desna Sisarich (1973 - EMI)

Compilations
The Very Best Of... (2001 - EMI)
Aire of Good Feeling - Best Of (2008 - EMI)

References

External links
The Quincy Conserve on Audio Culture
 
 Entries at 45cat.com

1967 establishments in New Zealand
1975 disestablishments in New Zealand
New Zealand rock music groups
Musical groups established in 1967
Musical groups disestablished in 1975